The 2008 Cheltenham Council election took place on 1 May 2008 to elect members of Cheltenham Borough Council in Gloucestershire, England. Half of the council was up for election and the council stayed under no overall control.

After the election, the composition of the council was
Liberal Democrat 20
Conservative 17
People Against Bureaucracy 3

Campaign
Before the election the Conservatives and Liberal Democrats had 17 seats each, People Against Bureaucracy 5 and Labour 1 seat, with the Conservatives forming the administration. 20 seats were being contested with both Conservatives and Liberal Democrats contesting all of the seats, while Labour contested 9, Greens 4 and People Against Bureaucracy 3 seats. The only Labour councillor Diana Hale stood down at the election, along with 2 Conservative and 1 People Against Bureaucracy councillors, while Liberal Democrat councillor Chris Coleman contested Leckhampton instead of his existing seat in St Paul's ward.

During the campaign the national Conservative leader David Cameron briefly visited Cheltenham to campaign, raising the issues of post offices being closed, garden grabbing, preserving local shops and house building on flood plains.

Election result
The results saw the Liberal Democrats become the largest party on the council with 20 of the 40 seats after making 3 gains. The Liberal Democrats held vulnerable seats in All Saints and St Peters wards, while making gains from each of the other 3 groups which had been defending seats. They also almost defeated the Conservative leader of the council Duncan Smith who held on by 33 votes in Charlton Kings ward.

The Conservatives stayed on 17 seats, while the People Against Bureaucracy group lost 2 seats to have 3 councillors. Labour was wiped out after losing their last seat in Oakley, with the party only coming in third place in the ward. Overall turnout in the election was 35.1%.

As a result of the election the Liberal Democrats took over control of the administration of the council from the Conservatives. The change in control came in a vote with the Liberal Democrat leader Steve Jordan receiving 18 votes, compared to 19 abstentions and the remaining 3 councillors being absent.

Ward results

Christopher Coleman was a sitting councillor in St Paul’s.

References

2008 English local elections
2008
2000s in Gloucestershire